The Jameh Mosque of Marandiz is related to the Ilkhanate and is located in the Marandiz.

References

Mosques in Iran
Mosque buildings with domes
National works of Iran
Tourist attractions in Razavi Khorasan Province
Marandiz